Harrisburg High School is a public high school in Harrisburg, Oregon, United States.

Academics
In 2008, 83% of the school's seniors received a high school diploma. Of 75 students, 62 graduated, five dropped out, two received a modified diploma, and six were still in high school the following year.

Band
The Harrisburg band program consists of nearly 50 members. They march in the annual Harrisburg Light Parade every year, and the Victoria Day parade in Canada once every four years. They play at eight basketball games, and every home football game. The band is under the direction of Gus Gyde. The high school's concert, pep, and marching bands all consist of the same members. A jazz band program is offered as a zero period class and they play at Hoodoo Ski Resort once a year.

Sports
Under the leadership of Wayne Swango, Harrisburg has won four state titles in baseball, in 1970, 1976, 1980 and 1993. Harrisburg won state championships in 2A softball in 1999, 2000, and 2001, and in 1A Division B football in 1966. They also won the 3A football state championships in 2016. The HHS track team boys won the 3a district meet, three years in a row from the 2009 through 2011, under the leadership of Scott Phelps. In 2016 the Harrisburg eagles won 3A state Champion.

References

High schools in Linn County, Oregon
Public high schools in Oregon